Nesterianka is a village in Polohy Raion (district) in Zaporizhzhia Oblast of southern Ukraine, at about  southeast from the centre of Kherson city.

The village came under attack by Russian forces in 2022, during the Russian invasion of Ukraine.

References

Villages in Polohy Raion